Mohini Dey is a Bengali Indian electric bass player. She has been part of Coke Studio and also plays for A. R. Rahman.

Born into a musical family, Mohini's father is Sujoy Dey, a jazz fusion bass guitarist, and her mother is Romia Dey, a classical singer.  She also has a younger sister Esani, who is a guitarist.  

When Mohini was born, her parents were struggling to make ends meet, as her father worked as a sessions musician.  Her father noticed her musical talent before Mohini turned 3 years old and started to nurture it from that point.  She received her first Fender Jazz Bass guitar when she was 9 or 10 years old. 

She was a prodigy, giving performances since she was 11. Her talent was noticed by her father's friend Ranjit Barot, who took her on his band's tours. She was also mentored by jazz exponent Louis Banks. 

She has collaborated with several other musicians including Marco Minnemann,  Jordan Rudess of Dream Theater, Jason Richardson, Dewa Budjana, Zakir Hussain, Sivamani and A. R. Rahman.

Dey was born and brought up in Mumbai and speaks Marathi, Hindi, Bengali and English. She is married to Saxophonist Mark Hartsuch.

References 

Indian bass guitarists
Living people
Musicians from Kolkata
Bengali musicians
1996 births